Pedro Sass Petrazzi (born 15 September 1990) is a Brazilian footballer who plays as a midfielder for Dečić.

Career
Born in Jaboticabal, he played with Comercial FC from Ribeirão Preto back in Brazil.  In 2009, he moved to Europe, to Hungary, and joined Kaposvölgye VSC.  After one season he moved to Kaposvári Rákóczi FC where he will play four seasons in the Nemzeti Bajnokság I, Hungarian championship.  Afterwards, he moved to Greece and played in the 2013–14 Super League Greece with Levadiakos.  Next stop was Israel, he joined Hapoel Ra'anana in summer 2014.  He played the first half of the 2014–15 Israeli Premier League and in the winter-break he moved to Kazakhstan where he played with Shakhter Karagandy in the 2015 Kazakhstan Premier League.  Sass left Shakhter Karagandy by mutual consent on 23 September 2015.  In February 2016, after successful trials, he signed with Serbian side Borac Čačak earning the shirt number 7.  He was one of Borac winter-break signings as the club was having an historical season by being second placed in the 2015–16 Serbian SuperLiga winter-break and clearly aiming for a spot in European competitions next summer.

Career statistics

References

References
 Pedro Petrazzi stats at utakmica.rs 
 Player profile at HLSZ 
 

1985 births
Living people
Brazilian footballers
Comercial Futebol Clube (Ribeirão Preto) players
Kaposvölgye VSC footballers
Kaposvári Rákóczi FC players
Levadiakos F.C. players
Hapoel Ra'anana A.F.C. players
FK Borac Čačak players
Hapoel Nof HaGalil F.C. players
Hapoel Umm al-Fahm F.C. players
Hapoel Ashdod F.C. players
FK Dečić players
Serbian SuperLiga players
Super League Greece players
Israeli Premier League players
Liga Leumit players
Nemzeti Bajnokság I players
Kazakhstan Premier League players
Montenegrin First League players
Brazilian expatriate footballers
Expatriate footballers in Hungary
Expatriate footballers in Greece
Expatriate footballers in Israel
Expatriate footballers in Serbia
Expatriate footballers in Montenegro
Brazilian expatriate sportspeople in Hungary
Brazilian expatriate sportspeople in Greece
Brazilian expatriate sportspeople in Israel
Brazilian expatriate sportspeople in Serbia
Brazilian expatriate sportspeople in Montenegro
Brazilian people of Italian descent
Association football midfielders
People from Jaboticabal